Spaceflight is a 1985 American documentary miniseries about crewed spaceflight, originally broadcast by PBS in four parts. It is narrated by Martin Sheen and features interviews with many former astronauts from the Mercury, Gemini, Apollo, and Space Shuttle programs. The series is a co-production of WETA-TV and WYES-TV. The final episode (Part 4) was redone after the Space Shuttle Challenger disaster (the revision covered the inquiry and the return to flight as well).

Episodes 
Thunder in the Skies
The Wings of Mercury
One Giant Leap
The Territory Ahead

External links 

PBS original programming
1980s American television miniseries
1980s American documentary television series
1985 American television series debuts
1985 American television series endings